Sykaminea is a village and a community of the Elassona municipality. Before the 2011 local government reform it was a part of the community of Karya of which it was a communal district. The 2011 census recorded 94 inhabitants in the village. The community of Sykaminea covers an area of 47.254 km2.

Population
According to the 2011 census, the population of the settlement of Sykaminea was 94 people, a decrease of almost 34% compared with the population of the previous census of 2001.

See also
 List of settlements in the Larissa regional unit

References

Populated places in Larissa (regional unit)